Joan Rigol i Roig (Torrelles de Llobregat - 4 April 1943) is a Spanish politician. He is a former president of the Parliament of Catalonia. Rigol also sat in the Spanish Congress from 1979 to 1980, representing Barcelona Province.

He studied philosophy and holds a Master in Business Administration from ESADE. In 1976 he joined the Democratic Union of Catalonia (UDC), the political party which he presided from 1987 to 2000.

References

1943 births
Living people
People from Baix Llobregat
Democratic Union of Catalonia politicians
Convergence and Union politicians
Presidents of the Parliament of Catalonia
Members of the Parliament of Catalonia
Members of the 1st Congress of Deputies (Spain)
ESADE alumni
Labour ministers of Catalonia
Culture ministers of Catalonia